Alexandre Miniac (5 July 1885 – 3 December 1963) was a French architect and watercolorist.

1885 births
1963 deaths
20th-century French architects
20th-century French painters
20th-century French male artists
University of Rennes alumni